Beaulac may refer to:

Family name
Polydore Beaulac was a politician in the Quebec, Canada. He served as Member of the Legislative Assembly. 
Willard L. Beaulac (1899–1990) was a United States Diplomat. He served as U.S. Ambassador to Paraguay, Colombia, Cuba, Chile and Argentina.

Place

Canada
Beaulac-Garthby is a municipality in the province of Quebec.

Egypt
Bulaq, alternatively spelt Beaulac, is a district of Cairo.

France
Bernos-Beaulac is a commune in the Gironde department in Aquitaine in southwestern France.